"Song of the Old Mother" is a poem by William Butler Yeats that first appeared in The Wind Among the Reeds anthology, published in 1899. The poem echoes Yeats' fascination with the Irish peasantry.

Written in first person, the poem explains the difficult chores and struggles of an aged, unfortunate woman and her bitter resentment to the young children, whose worries of fondness and personal appearance pale to insignificance when compared to the toils of the old woman.

There is some confusion whether the term "mother" should be taken literally, or if it refers to old women in general. The subject of the poem is in fact a maid of some kind, employed in a wealthy household. This would increase the resentment she feels, experiencing almost abject jealousy of not having the option to live that kind of life.

The poem has a convenient form; ten lines in length with each line holding four stresses. It is almost like a confining grid, emphasizing the Old Mother's unbending existence. There is a clear rhyming scheme of couplets, with a nice half rhyme towards the end which rounds the poem off properly.

In the poem, the fire the Old Mother lights in the morning is meant to represent the Old Mother herself, waking up when the fire is blown, and resting when the fire grows both "cold" and "feeble".

The rhyming style of the poem represents that of childish songs and nursery rhymes. The simplicity touches the reader. The poem is not a glorified message on the human condition, merely an Old Mother's views, possibly never expressed in real life. Perhaps these views are invalid because her viewpoint is heavily biased. Maybe if the Old Mother looked back at her own youth, she would discover what a silly young thing she was as well. The word choice of "must" in the penultimate line suggests that the old mother had no choice, she had to work, had to "scrub, bake and sweep".

Poem:

I rise in the dawn, and I kneel and blow
Till the seed of the fire flicker and glow;
And then I must scrub and bake and sweep
Till stars are beginning to blink and peep;
And the young lie long and dream in their bed
Of the matching of ribbons for bosom and head,
And their days go over in idleness,
And they sigh if the wind but lift a tress:
While I must work because I am old,
And the seed of the fire gets feeble and cold.

See also
 1899 in poetry
 List of works by William Butler Yeats

External links

1888 poems
Poetry by W. B. Yeats